Riachuelo is a village west of the town of Río Negro in south-central Chile. It lies along to Chile Route U-72. It had 801 inhabitants as of 2017.

References

Populated places in Osorno Province